The following lists some of the events from the year 2017 in Russia.

Incumbents
President: Vladimir Putin
Prime Minister: Dmitry Medvedev

Events

January
 6 January - Russia begins to withdraw forces from Syria starting with an aircraft carrier group. Meanwhile, a declassified report in the US claims that President Putin ordered a campaign to influence last year's election against Democratic candidate, Hillary Clinton.
 9 January - The death toll of people who died from alcohol poisoning in Irkutsk rises to 76.\
20 January - A rally was held against the transfer of Saint Isaac's Cathedral to the Russian Orthodox Church in St. Petersburg.
27 January - Russian lawmakers voted, 380–3, to decriminalize certain forms of domestic violence. Under the new law, first-time offenses that do not result in "serious bodily harm" carry a maximum fine of 30,000 rubles, up to 15 days' administrative arrest, or up to 120 hours of community service.

February
 8 February –  The Russian government gives names to five previously unnamed Kuril islands in Sakhalin Oblast: Derevyanko Island (after Kuzma Derevyanko), Gnechko Island (after Alexey Gnechko), Gromyko Island (after Andrei Gromyko), Farkhutdinov Island (after Igor Farkhutdinov) and Shchetinina Island (after Anna Shchetinina).

March
 26 March - Protests against alleged corruption in the federal Russian government took place simultaneously in many cities across the country. They were triggered by the lack of proper response from the Russian authorities to the published investigative film He Is Not Dimon to You, which has garnered more than 20 million views on YouTube.

April
 20 April – The Russian government has prohibited Jehovah's Witnesses in all of Russia, going in favor of the Ministry of Justice.
 30 April – Russian Grand Prix F-1

May
 29 May – 15 people die and around 200 are injured following a severe thunderstorm in Moscow and its suburbs.

June
 1–3 June – St. Petersburg International Economic Forum
 10 June – A gunman, 49-year-old Igor Zenkov, kills four people before being shot dead by local police and the National Guard during a special operation in the township of Kratovo, Moscow Oblast.
 17 June – 2 July – 2017 FIFA Confederations Cup
 22–29 June – Moscow International Film Festival

September
 1 September – Russian President Vladimir Putin expelled 755 diplomats response to United States sanctions takes effect.
10 September 
2017 Karelia head election
2017 Russian elections

October
 2 October – Iran nuclear deal cover by Russia official, US ambassador to UN  warns, Russia is backing shield prevent to pass agreement to United States President, Donald Trump.

November
 5 November - 260 anti-government demonstrators are arrested in Moscow.
 26 November - Polina Bogusevich wins the Junior Eurovision Song Contest 2017 with the song, Wings.

December
 5 December - The International Olympic Committee bans Russia from the 2018 Winter Olympics in PyeongChang due to evidence of systemic cheating at the 2014 Winter Olympics in Sochi. (Yahoo!)

Deaths

 20 May – Alexander Alexandrovich Volkov, 1st President of the Udmurt Republic (b. 1951)
 29 August – Evdokia Bobyleva, teacher (b. 1919)
 10 September – Leila Mardanshina, oil and gas operator (b. 1927)

Predicted and scheduled events

August
 15–20 August – MAKS Air Show

September
 24 September – Moscow Marathon
 28 September – 1 October – IgroMir

See also
List of Russian films of 2017
2017–2018 Russian protests
2017 Russian Circuit Racing Series

References

 
Russia
2010s in Russia
Years of the 21st century in Russia
Russia
Russia